The Canton of Saint-Gervais-sur-Mare is a former subdivision of the French department of Hérault, and its subdivision, the Arrondissement of Béziers. It had 8,610 inhabitants (2012). It was disbanded following the French canton reorganisation which came into effect in March 2015.

Composition
The canton comprised the following communes:

 Les Aires
 Castanet-le-Haut
 Combes
 Hérépian
 Lamalou-les-Bains
 Le Poujol-sur-Orb
 Rosis
 Saint-Gervais-sur-Mare
 Saint-Geniès-de-Varensal
 Taussac-la-Billière
 Villemagne-l'Argentière

References

Saint-Gervais-sur-Mare
2015 disestablishments in France
States and territories disestablished in 2015